Jediah Hill Covered Bridge is a historic bridge near Cincinnati, Ohio. It was listed in the National Register of Historic Places in 1973. The wooden covered bridge was built in 1850.

Notes 

Hill
Bridges completed in 1850
Hill
National Register of Historic Places in Hamilton County, Ohio
Wooden bridges in Ohio
Road bridges on the National Register of Historic Places in Ohio